Timothy J. Hickey (born July 24, 1955) is a professor of computer science and Chair of the Computer Science and Internet Studies Program (INET) at Brandeis University.

Hickey's specialties include analysis of algorithms, logic programming and parallel processing, symbolic manipulation, and groupware. His current research involved the study of Educational Technology, Brain-Computer Interfaces and Game-based Learning. He is the co-creator and lead developer of the JScheme programming language and the GrewpEdit collaborative editor.

Hickey holds a B.A. from Brandeis University and an M.S. and Ph.D. from the University of Chicago.

References

External links
 Professor Hickey's website
 GrewpEdit website
 JScheme website

Brandeis University faculty
American computer scientists
Brandeis University alumni
1955 births
Living people
University of Chicago alumni